The men's middleweight (+84 kilograms) event at the 2002 Asian Games took place on 13 October 2002 at Gudeok Gymnasium, Busan, South Korea.

A total of twelve competitors from twelve countries competed in this event, limited to fighters whose body weight was more than 84 kilograms.

Moon Dae-sung of South Korea won the gold medal.

Schedule
All times are Korea Standard Time (UTC+09:00)

Results 
Legend
P — Won by punitive declaration

References
2002 Asian Games Official Report, Page 725

External links
Official website

Taekwondo at the 2002 Asian Games